Mercurio may refer to:

People
 Mercurio Martinez (born 1937), Texas politician; see Laredo College
 Angelo Mercurio (1936–2006), Italian-American mobster
 Gus Mercurio (1928–2010), American-born Australian character actor
 Jed Mercurio (21st century), British writer
 Paul Mercurio (born 1963), Australian actor and dancer
 Mercurio (wrestler), the ring name of a Mexican professional wrestler

El Mercurio
 El Mercurio, a Chilean newspaper
 El Mercurio de Valparaíso, another Chilean newspaper
 El Mercurio (Ecuador), an Ecuadorian newspaper

Other
 Mercurio the 4-D Man, a fictional character that appears in the Marvel Universe
 Mercurio (album), of 2013 by Italian rapper Emis Killa

See also
 Mercury (disambiguation)